Taleranol (INN, USAN) (developmental code name P-1560), or teranol, also known as β-zearalanol, is a synthetic, nonsteroidal estrogen of the resorcylic acid lactone group related to mycoestrogens found in Fusarium spp which was never marketed. It is the β epimer of zeranol (α-zearalanol) and is a major metabolite of zeranol but with less biological activity.

See also
 α-Zearalenol
 β-Zearalenol
 Zearalanone
 Zearalenone

References

Lactones
Mycoestrogens
Mycotoxins
Resorcinols